Ding Xuedong (born February 1960) is the current Deputy Secretary-General of the State Council of the People's Republic of China. He was the Chairman & CEO of China Investment Corporation previously. 

Ding holds a Ph.D. in economics from the Research Institute for Fiscal Science,  Ministry of Finance. In his earlier career, Mr. Ding served as Director General of the Department of Property Rights and Director General of the Department of Human Resources & Head of the General Office, State-owned Asset Administration Bureau.

Subsequently, he held several positions in the Ministry of Finance, including Vice Minister, Assistant Minister, Director General of the Department of Education, Science and Culture, Director General of the Department of Agriculture and Director General of the Department of State-owned Capital Administration. Ding served as Deputy Secretary General of the State Council.

Ding is also chairman of China International Capital Corporation, a leading Chinese investment bank in which China Investment Corporation indirectly holds over 40% interest.

Ding was a member of the 19th Central Committee of the Communist Party in 2017 and the 20th Central Committee of the Communist Party in 2022.

References 

Chinese chief executives
1960 births
Living people
Place of birth missing (living people)
Zhongnan University of Economics and Law alumni
Businesspeople from Changzhou
21st-century Chinese businesspeople
Members of the 19th Central Committee of the Chinese Communist Party
Members of the 20th Central Committee of the Chinese Communist Party
Politicians from Changzhou
People's Republic of China politicians from Jiangsu
Chinese Communist Party politicians from Jiangsu